The hooded antpitta (Grallaricula cucullata) is a species of bird in the family Grallariidae. It is found in Colombia and Venezuela.

Its natural habitat is subtropical or tropical moist montane forest. It is threatened by habitat loss.

References

External links
BirdLife Species Factsheet.

hooded antpitta
Birds of the Colombian Andes
Birds of the Venezuelan Andes
hooded antpitta
hooded antpitta
Taxonomy articles created by Polbot